The Hope Girl Scout Little House is a historic log house near the junction of Jones Street and Fair Park in Hope, Arkansas.  It is a single-story log structure, built in 1938 with funding from the Works Progress Administration.  It was designed by Washington, DC architect Donn Barber as a demonstration home for a family with modest income, and afterward served for a quarter century as the principal meeting place of the local Girl Scout organization.

The house was listed on the National Register of Historic Places in 2015.

See also
National Register of Historic Places listings in Hempstead County, Arkansas

References

Houses on the National Register of Historic Places in Arkansas
Houses completed in 1938
Houses in Hempstead County, Arkansas
National Register of Historic Places in Hempstead County, Arkansas